The Return of Bulldog Drummond was the seventh Bulldog Drummond novel. It was published in 1932 and written by H. C. McNeile under the pen name Sapper.

References

Bibliography

External links
 

1932 British novels
British crime novels
English novels
Hodder & Stoughton books
British novels adapted into films